An illustrated stamped envelope is a stamped envelope with an additional work of art on the face side of the envelope.

References

каталог художественных маркированных конвертов (ХМК) СССР (Catalog of illustrated stamped envelopes of the Soviet Union, 1953–1991)

Envelopes